Presidential elections were held in Chile in 1901, following the death of President Pedro Montt on August 16 that year. His successor, Vice President Elías Fernández Albano, died less than a month later. Fernández's vice president Emiliano Figueroa then called new presidential elections. Political parties agreed on presenting a single candidate – Ramón Barros – as a symbol of unity in celebration of Chile's first centenary of independence.

Results

References

Presidential elections in Chile
Chile
1910 in Chile
Election and referendum articles with incomplete results